Vincent William Moloney (22 July 1920 – 26 July 2000) was an Australian rules footballer who played with South Melbourne in the Victorian Football League (VFL).

His younger brother George Moloney also played for South Melbourne.

Moloney enlisted in the Royal Australian Navy in July 1943 and served for the remainder of World War II.

Notes

External links 

1920 births
2000 deaths
Australian rules footballers from Victoria (Australia)
Sydney Swans players
Royal Australian Navy personnel of World War II